Ravishankar Shukla Stadium is a cricket ground in Durg, Chhattisgarh. The hosted its first match between Madhya Pradesh cricket team against Uttar Pradesh cricket team in 1979. After 20 year, the stadium hosted its first List-A match between Madhya Pradesh cricket team against Uttar Pradesh cricket team where Madhya Pradesh cricket team won 6 wickets. Devendra Bundela and Abbas Ali scored unbeaten 125 and 106 respectively. Then the stadium hosts its last match between Madhya Pradesh cricket team against Uttar Pradesh cricket team in 1999/00 Ranji Trophy and the match was drawn.

References

External links 
 Cricketarchive
 Cricinfo

Buildings and structures in Durg
Multi-purpose stadiums in India
Sports venues in Chhattisgarh
Cricket grounds in Chhattisgarh
Sports venues completed in 1979
1979 establishments in Madhya Pradesh
20th-century architecture in India